Contest is a 2013 American comedy-drama film written and directed by Anthony Joseph Giunta and starring Kenton Duty, Daniel Flaherty, Katherine McNamara, and Mary Beth Peil. The film premiered at the 2013 Mill Valley Film Festival, and aired on Cartoon Network on October 6, 2013, as part of their Stop Bullying, Speak Up promotion.

Plot
A bullied teen chef wants to save his grandmother's business by entering a TV cooking contest to win the prize money, only to find his worst bully, Matt Prylek, suddenly pushing to become his new friend—and contest teammate. Meanwhile, Matt's brother Kyle wants him to do some villainous stuff.

Cast
 Kenton Duty as Matt Prylek
 Daniel Flaherty as Tommy Dolen
 Katherine McNamara as Sarah O'Malley
 Mary Beth Peil as "Gran" Angela Maria Tucci
 Kyle Dean Massey as Kyle Prylek
 Alex Boniello as Joe Grasso
 Owen Teague as Bobby Butler
 Talon G. Ackerman as Will Terkin
 Chris Riggi as Ned
 Jan Uczkowski as Philip King
 Tina Benko as Rhonda
 Morgan B. Ackerman as Lada Bartosh
 Marc John Jefferies as Xav
 Robert Wuhl as Zack Conti
 Ricky Ullman as Rip

Production
The film began pre-production on February 1, 2012 and ended pre-production on June 12, 2012. Production occurred in Liberty, NY and Fallsburg, NY on June 13, 2012 through July 13, 2012. Post-production concluded at the end of September 2013 shortly before the movie's October 5, 2013 debut at Mill Valley Film Festival and the premiere the following evening, October 6, 2013 on Cartoon Network.

Reception
On Rotten Tomatoes the film has 2 reviews listed, both positive.

The movie won an Audience Award at Mill Valley Film Festival. It also won a Family Choice Award.

Trivia 
Maria Ciuffo, known as Barstool Sports' "Ria", auditioned for and was offered a role in Contest.  She ended up having to turn it down so as not to miss high school exams.

References

External links
 

2013 films
2010s coming-of-age comedy-drama films
2010s teen comedy-drama films
American coming-of-age comedy-drama films
American teen comedy-drama films
Films about bullying
Films shot in New York City
American independent films
2013 independent films
2010s English-language films
2010s American films